Barren Lands First Nation  is a First Nation located on the north shore of Reindeer Lake in northern Manitoba close to the Saskatchewan border.

Demographics

The population of Brochet 197 in 2011 was 547, a 78.8% increase from the 2006 population of 306. The median age was 20.9. Among its residents, 265 chose Cree as their mother tongue and 15 chose Dene. All but 10 spoke English.

The residents of the Brochet 197 reserve and the community of Brochet, itself with 146 residents, form a population centre of 693 people also called Brochet.

Membership
As of February 2013, the total membership of Barren Lands First Nation was 1,075 with 455 members living on-reserve or on crown land and 620 members living off-reserve.

The First Nation is governed by a Chief and three councillors  and is affiliated with the Keewatin Tribal Council. The Keewatin Tribal Council with its head office in Thompson represents eleven First Nations in Northern Manitoba.

See also 
Brochet Airport

References

External links
 Barren Lands First Nation
 Map of Brochet 197 at Statcan
 The Barren Lands Collection, University of Toronto

Keewatin Tribal Council
First Nations governments in Manitoba